The Internet Hunt was a monthly online game and search training tool, conceived  and conducted by Rick Gates, as Director of Library Automation UC Santa Barbara, which began 31 August 1992, before the World Wide Web.

Most Internet Hunts were composed of ten questions that Gates had verified could be answered with Internet sources exclusively, and tools of that time, such as Usenet, Telnet, FTP, and, Archie, Jughead, Veronica, and Gopher. The first individual or team to answer all ten questions correctly and provide the method used to answer them was declared the winner(s).

The Internet Hunt ran from Aug 1992 to 1995.  It was mentioned in a book, on a website, and on LISTSERVs.

References

External links
  (Questions and answers)
 
 
 
 
 
 

History of the Internet
Computer-related introductions in 1992